Sanusi Mohammed Ohiare (born 6 March 1985) is a Nigerian rural energy development expert, public servant, the executive director of the Rural Electrification Fund and board member of the Rural Electrification Agency who was appointed by president Muhammadu Buhari in April 2017. The Rural Electrification Agency is one of the  federal government agencies under the Ministry of Power, Works and Housing. He was reappointed as executive director of the rural electrification fund in January 2022 for another five years term by president Muhammadu Buhari.

Early life and education 
He was born on the 6th of March 1985 in Abuja Nigeria's Federal Capital Territory where he spent most of his early years and he hails from Adavi Local Government Area in Kogi State north central Nigeria. His father, former Senator Mohammed Ohiare was representing Kogi central senatorial district at Nigeria's national assembly. He is a well known politician both in federal and state levels, he contributed positively to the development of the people within Kogi central senatorial district while serving as a senator and afterwards. 
Sanusi has a bachelor’s degree in economics from University of Jos, Plateau state Nigeria between 2002 and 2006. Between 2009 and 2011, he attended the University of Dundee, Scotland, United Kingdom, where he obtained a Master of Science degree in energy Studies, with a specialization in energy finance. Thereafter, he received his PhD in Rural Energy Development from De Montfort University, Leicester, United Kingdom, in 2015

Career 
He was appointed by President Muhammadu Buhari in April 2017, as an executive director of the Rural Electrification Fund and board member under the Rural Electrification Agency of Nigeria.
Prior to his being appointed as the executive director of the Rural Electrification Fund he worked with the German International Cooperation (Deutsche Gesellschaft für Internationale Zusammenarbeit),(GIZ), as a national advisor on rural electrification, under the Nigerian Energy Support Programme (NESP), which is co-funded by the European Union and German Government. With about 16 years experience within the Rural Electrification space he has brought his experience to bear on the job at the agency.

Association memberships 
He is a member of various professional bodies and associations such as International Association of Energy Economics (IAEE), an international non-profit society of professionals with interest in energy economics with also its national chapters in different parts of the world including the Nigerian Association of Energy Economics (NAEE), Nigeria, Lagos Oil Club, Society of Petroleum Engineers (SPE), Energy Institute United Kingdom. and a Fellow of Mandela Washington Fellowship for Young African Leaders, at The Regents of the University of California, Davis, California, United States.

Humanitarian work & speaking activities 
In 2019, he founded the Sanusi Ohiare Foundation for the purpose of empowering women and children in Africa through education, sports and rural electrification which he reaches out to the less privileged.
He has presented speeches and also been a keynote speaker at several events on rural electrification including fourth national council on power (NACOP) in Edo state, policy dialogue in Abuja and other events in promoting rural electrification in Nigeria.

Achievement(s) 
 He has contributed in facilitating the actualization of the rural electrification as stated in an interview in 2019 when he stated that about 43,000 households had been provide with electricity through the two billion naira fund received by the agency.
 As the executive director of Nigeria's Rural Electrification Fund (REF) he leads the dedication of staff and team members to ensure that electricity is equally distributed to various communities using rural electrification grants. Akpabom community in Akwa Ibom State, a community of about 2,000 people who are engaged mainly in crop and fish farming is one of the communities to first benefit from the first tranche of the fund which had been dormant prior to his appointment.

Publications 
 He co-authored the article titled The Evolution of Rural Household Electricity Demand in Grid-Connected Communities in Developing Countries.
 Financing Rural Energy Projects in Developing Countries: A Case Study of Nigeria by Sanusi Mohammed Ohiare
 Financing Rural energy Projects in China: Lessons from Nigeria, Vol 3, No 4, 2021, ISSN 1923-4023

Award & recognition(s) 
 In 2021, he was published among Nigeria's 10 Under 50 Leaders in Public Service alongside the managing director and chief executive officer of the Rural Electrification Agency Mr Ahmad Salihijo Ahmad
 Global Finalists-Professional Achievement Award 2021 by the British Council.
 Young Leader of the 2020 African Power, Energy & Water Industry Awards
 Traditional title of Akiliwo Ejeh meaning (The Strength of the King) by the Ejeh of Olamaboro, His Royal Highness, Ujah Simeon Sani.

References

External links
 Official Profile of Dr Sanusi Mohammed Ohaire: REA site

Living people
Nigerian politicians
1985 births